The governor of Rhode Island is the head of government of Rhode Island and serves as commander-in-chief of the state's Army National Guard and Air National Guard. The current governor is Dan McKee. John W. Davis, Herbert W. Ladd, and Aram J. Pothier each served two non-consecutive stints, while James Fenner served three non-consecutive stints as governor.

Party affiliation

Colonial Rhode Island, 1640–1775

List of governors of Rhode Island, 1775–present 

 Parties

Succession

See also 

 List of lieutenant governors of Rhode Island

Notes

References

External links
Governor's digitized records from the Rhode Island State Archives
Governor of Rhode Island: Proclamations Issued from the Rhode Island State Archives
Governor's Executive Orders from the Rhode Island State Archives
Guide to the Governor's Executive Orders from the Rhode Island State Archives
Guide to the Tavares Collection from the Rhode Island State Archives

Lists of state governors of the United States
Governors
Governor